Midnight is a 2021 South Korean thriller film, written and directed by Kwon Oh-seung. The film starring Jin Ki-joo, Wi Ha-joon and Kim Hye-yoon, depicts a life-threatening hide-and-seek scenario between a psychopathic killer and a deaf woman. The film  was slated to release in 2020 but its release was postponed due to the resurgence of the COVID-19 pandemic. Finally the film was released simultaneously in theatres and via streaming media TVING on June 30, 2021. Midnight is also  available on iQIYI from 18 September 2021.

Synopsis
Kyeong-mi (Jin Ki-joo), a deaf woman, works as a sign language counselor at the sign language call center. One night she witnesses So Jung-eun's (Kim Hye-yoon) stabbing and becomes a new target for the Jekyll and Hyde serial killer Do-sik (Wi Ha-joon). It now turns into a silent chase. Jong Tak (Park Hoon), So Jung-eun's brother, a security guard has to protect his sister. On the other hand Kyeong-mi's deaf mother (Gil Hae-yeon) will do anything to protect her daughter.

Cast

 Jin Ki-joo as Kim Kyung-mi, a deaf person who works as a sign language counselor at a call center
 Wi Ha-joon as Do-shik, a serial killer, who attacks women and men at night 
 Kim Hye-yoon as Choi Seo-jung, Jong-tak's younger sister
 Park Hoon as Jong-tak, brother of Choi Seo-jung, a former officer in the Marine Corps, currently working at a security company
 Gil Hae-yeon as Kyung-mi's mother
 Kang In-seo as male employee 1
 Noh Su-min as couple man
 Na Eun-saem as couple woman
 Lee Jae-seok as employee 5
 Park Ji-hoon
 Song Yoo-hyun as section chief

Special appearance
 Bae Eun-woo as Police
 Kwon Young-min
 Jung Wo Chang as Police 2

Production
In August 2019, Jin Ki-joo and Wi Ha-joon confirmed their appearance for the film.

Filming began on September 8, 2019.

Release
The film was released simultaneously in theatres and via streaming media TVING on June 30, 2021.

Midnight got invitation from Fantasia International Film Festival and New York Asian Film Festival to screen the film. The three-week festivals was held from August 5 to 25 in Montreal, Canada and from August 6 to 22, 2021 in New York respectively. In 20th New York Asian Film Festival the film was screened in the ‘Genre Masters’ section on August 7, at Lincoln Center and SVA Theatre. In 25th Fantasia International Film Festival the film was screened in the ‘Canadian Premiere’ section on August 22, 2021. It was also invited at the 13th UK Grimmfest Film Festival, held from October 7 to October 10, where it won the best feature award.

The film has also been invited at New Zealand International Film Festival in Wellington edition to be screened on November 12, 2021.

The film entered the new director competition section of the 40th Brussels International Fantastic Film Festival and was screened for Belgian premiere on September 2, 2022.

Reception

Box office
The film was released on June 30, 2021 on 693 screens. According to the integrated computer network for movie theater admissions by the Korea Film Council (KoFiC), the film was at third place on the Korean box office by collecting 25,566 audience on the opening day. It is at 21st place among all the Korean films released in the year 2021, with gross of US$796,540 and 108,523 admissions, .

Critical response

Seo Jeong-won reviewing for Maeil Business quoted from Gayatri Chakravorty Spivak's, essays Can Subalterns Speak?, to highlight the subjugation of the 'subalterns' (sub-subjects) at the bottom of society, including women and migrants. Jeong-won opined that the way two mute and deaf women fought the serial killer and used their own means to confront the killer made it different. Ending review Jeong-won wrote, "The clear contrast between the stillness and the roar is also common. The more you watch Midnight with your breath, the more you can enjoy the film's gauguin."

Seoul Economic Daily reporter Choi Soo-jin reviewing the film wrote that the fast-paced chase of deaf and mute, in everyday space is main attraction of the film. Quoting director Oh-seung Kwon, as: “It was made by grinding the cartilage of the actors,” the reviewer wrote, "....the movie's charm is the performances of the actors running and running. Runs, slides, rolls and hangs on windows." Praising the performance of Jin Ki-joo Soo-jin wrote, "Jin Ki-joo's passion for acting, who plays Kyung-mi, who is deaf, also stands out." For other actors, Wi Ha-jun Wi and Park Hoon Soo-jin opined, "After the efforts of the two actors, an action scene full of hit was completed."

Awards and nominations

References

External links
 
 
 
 

CJ Entertainment films
2020s Korean-language films
Films postponed due to the COVID-19 pandemic
2021 films
2021 thriller films
South Korean chase films
South Korean thriller films
Serial killer films
Films about deaf people
Films about mother–daughter relationships
TVING original films